Landshut (Bayern) Hauptbahnhof is the main railway station in Landshut in the German State of Bavaria. There is also the halt (Haltepunkt) of Landshut (Bay) Süd (Landshut south) on the Neumarkt-Sankt Veit – Landshut railway. The Hauptbahnhof has seven platforms tracks and is classified by Deutsche Bahn as a category 2 station. It is used daily by about 120 trains operated by DB Regio, Regentalbahn and Agilis. Landshut is on the Munich–Regensburg, Munich–Landshut–Passau and Landshut–Mühldorf lines. In addition, the station is located on the Landshut Neuhausen museum line.

Location 
The station is located north of the city of Landshut. The station area is bounded to the southeast by Bahnhofstraße, on which is located the station forecourt, which connects via Luitpoldstraße to central Landshut. East of the station is Altdorfer Straße; this runs over a bridge over the railway lands, which was built from 1964 to 1966 and reconstructed from 2007 to 2008. The northern edge of the station area is formed by Oberndorferstraße.

History

Old Landshut station 
In 1854, a terminal station was constructed near the Kleinen Isar (little Isar) river. To protect the station against flooding, numerous earthworks had to be constructed. In 1857, construction started on the station building, which is now a listed building. It was built of brick and designed by the architect Simon Pausinger. A platform area was established only shortly before the opening of the station in April 1858, .

The station opened on 3 November 1858 with the Munich–Landshut line. On 12 December 1859, this was followed by the extension of this line via Geiselhöring to Regensburg. On 6 August 1873, the Neufahrn–Eggmühl–Obertraubling short cut was opened between Landshut and Regensburg, making the detour via Geiselhöring unnecessary. But in the 1870s it was realised that the planned lines could not usefully serve Landshut station. In addition, the station was too small to be the starting point of the new lines.

New Landshut station 
It was eventually decided to build a new through station, which was built from 1876 to 1880. A siding from the old station was used to transport building materials for the new station. On 11 May 1880, station operations were transferred from the old station, which remains in place and is now a listed monument, and the tracks connecting to it were dismantled.

With the opening of the station on 15 May 1880 of the railway line via Pilsting to Plattling was followed by the opening of the Mühldorf–Landshut line on 4 October 1883. Duplication of the line from Munich to Landshut was completed on 28 September 1892. The branch line from Landshut to Rottenburg an der Laaber was opened on 3 November 1900.

On 30 June 1902, a horse tramway was opened from Landshut station to Dreifaltigkeitsplatz. On 15 January 1913, the Landshut tramway was electrified.

On 3 October 1925 the Munich–Landshut line was electrified. This was followed by the electrification of the Landshut–Neufahrn section on 1 October 1926 and the electrification of the entire route from Munich to Regensburg was completed on 10 May 1927.

In the Second World War the entire station area was destroyed by a bombing raid on 19 March 1945. The lines were rebuilt in the postwar years and the station had to be rebuilt due to the extensive damage. The building was opened on 19 March 1954. Also on 19 March 1945, the operation of the Landshut tramway was closed due to destruction of the tram depot in the air attacks.

On 25 May 1976, the line from Landshut to Plattling was electrified. On 25 May 1974, passenger operations on the Landshut–Rottenburg line closed. On 27 September 1998, freight traffic ended on the line and the Neuhausen–Rottenburg section was dismantled. The remaining section has been used as a museum railway since 4 June 2011.

Infrastructure 

The station has seven tracks on four platforms. Track 1 is on the “home” platform next to station building and is served by the Regionalbahn trains towards Mühldorf. Track 2 does not adjoin a platform and is used by through freight traffic. Track 3 is also used by Regionalbahn trains going towards Mühldorf. Tracks 4 and 5 are served by regional services towards Regensburg and Passau and track 6 is served by regional services to Munich. Track 7 is used in particular by Agilis services towards Regensburg and track 8 is used by Regionalbahn trains to Freising. Each platform is covered and has a digital destination display. All platforms are connected via a pedestrian underpass to the home platform. Only the first five tracks are accessible for the disabled as tracks 7 and 8 has no access for the disabled. Parking and bus connections are available at the station.

Platform data 
Track 1: platform height: 76 cm, length of platform: 365 meters 
Track 3: platform height: 76 cm, length of platform: 334 meters
Track 4: platform height: 76 cm, length of platform: 334 meters
Track 5: platform height: 76 cm, length of platform: 366 meters
Track 6: platform height: 76 cm, length of platform: 366 meters
Track 7: platform height: 30 cm, length of platform: 452 meters
Track 8: platform height: 30 cm, length of platform: 452 meters

Rail services

Since 9 December 2007, Arriva-Länderbahn-Express (ALEX) services run every two hours; these are operated by Länderbahn. Services of the Donau-Isar-Express run hourly from Munich to Passau and the Munich–Nuremberg–Regensburg Regional-Express service runs every two hours. In addition, Regionalbahn services run every hour between Freising and Landshut, serving all stops, unlike the Regional-Expresses.

Landshut station is part of the "Mühldorf line star" (Linienstern Mühldorf) network, so every hour Regionalbahn  services of SüdostBayernBahn run via Mühldorf to Freilassing or Rosenheim. In addition, Landshut is the terminus of individual Agilis services running via Regensburg to Ingolstadt.

The last long-distance service, a EuroCity service to Prague, ran a few years before the start of ALEX, which now operates on this route.

Notes

Railway stations in Bavaria
Buildings and structures in Landshut
Railway stations in Germany opened in 1858